The basketball tournament at the 1963 Mediterranean Games was held in Naples, Italy.

Medalists

References
1963 Mediterranean Games report at the International Committee of Mediterranean Games (CIJM) website
List of Olympians who won medals at the Mediterranean Games at Olympedia.org

Basketball
Basketball at the Mediterranean Games
International basketball competitions hosted by Italy
1963–64 in European basketball
1963 in Asian basketball
1963 in African basketball